Stepping Out is a British competitive dancing talent show that aired on ITV from 31 August to 28 September 2013, hosted by Davina McCall.

The judging panel, referred to on the show as "the front row", was confirmed on 29 August 2013 and consists of Mel B, Jason Gardiner and Wayne Sleep. Unlike other similar dance shows, the dancers were all couples in real life, not one celebrity plus one professional dancer.

Celebrity couples 
Oritsé Williams and girlfriend AJ Azari - WINNERS
Glynis Barber and husband Michael Brandon
Carl Froch and girlfriend Rachael Cordingly
Denise Welch and husband Lincoln Townley
Brian McFadden and then wife Vogue Williams
Laurence Llewelyn-Bowen and wife Jackie Llewelyn-Bowen

See also
Britain's Got Talent

References

External links

2010s British reality television series
2013 British television series debuts
2013 British television series endings
Ballroom dance
Dance competition television shows
English-language television shows
ITV reality television shows
Television series by ITV Studios